Dactylocardamum is a genus of flowering plants belonging to the family Brassicaceae.

Its native range is Peru.

Species:

Dactylocardamum imbricatifolium 
Dactylocardamum polyspermum

References

Brassicaceae
Brassicaceae genera